Wolf Creek Pass is the debut album by country musician C. W. McCall, released in 1975 (see 1975 in music) on MGM Records. It was recorded after the success of a song included in the album, "Old Home Filler-up an' Keep on a-Truckin' Cafe", which was used in a popular television commercial that helped make McCall famous. McCall himself was the pseudonym of Bill Fries and was convened by Fries along with Chip Davis of Mannheim Steamroller fame. The album concentrated predominantly on themes related to trucking, with many of them based on events in Fries' life. The album also contained the eponymous song "Wolf Creek Pass", which helped popularize the actual mountain pass (located in Colorado) itself.  The actual "Old Home Filler-up an' Keep on a-Truckin' Cafe" was located in Pisgah, Iowa.

The full name of the album is Wolf Creek Pass, The Old Home Filler-up an' Keep on a-Truckin' Cafe (and Other Wild Places.).

Track listing
All tracks composed by Bill Fries and Chip Davis
 "Wolf Creek Pass" – 3:55
 "Night Rider" – 2:30
 "Classified" – 2:28
 "Old 30" – 2:20
 "I've Trucked All Over This Land" – 2:46
 "Four Wheel Drive" – 2:58
 "Rocky Mountain September" – 3:10
 "Old Home Filler-up an' Keep on a-Truckin' Cafe" – 2:45
 "Sloan" – 3:08
 "Glenwood Canyon" – 3:10

Personnel

 C. W. McCall - vocals, design
 Carol Rogers, Liz Westphalen (The Puffys) - vocals
 Terry Waddell, Bill Berg - drums
 Curtis McPeake, Bobbie Thomas - banjo
 Larry Morton, Ron Agnew - guitar
 Chuck Sanders, Eric Hansen - bass
 Ron Steele - 12-string, 6-string electric guitar
 Gregg Fox - 12-string guitar
 Jackson Berkey - keyboards
 Chip Davis - producer, arranger, drums, strings
 Don Sears - producer, engineer, design
 Ron Ubel - engineer
 Steve Kline - photography

The title track was covered by Australian singer Lester Coombs. Lyrics were changed to fit Australian geography.
"Old 30" was covered in the mid-seventies by Australian radio DJ John Laws.  His version was entitled "Old 31 One More Time" and also modified to provide a moving portrait of Australian scenery.

Charts

Weekly charts

Year-end charts

Singles

References

External links
 NarrowGauge.org album information for Wolf Creek Pass

Wolf Creek Pass
Wolf Creek Pass
Wolf Creek Pass